King Without a Clue is the debut studio album by Australian musician Mark Seymour. The album was released in September 1997 and peaked at number 53 on the ARIA Charts. The album release included a second limited edition disc, titled "Live at The Continental". All of the tracks on this second disc were recorded live on 17 May 1997, at the Continental Cafe, in Melbourne, Australia.
 
At the ARIA Music Awards of 1998, the album earned Seymour a nomination in the category of Best Male Artist.

Reception

Jonathan Lewis from AllMusic "King Without a Clue is a disc of introspective, country-tinged songs... Seymour's vocals are as raw and aggressive as ever, although ballads like the haunting "The Ghost of Vainglory" show the same emotional side to Seymour that made "Throw Your Arms Around Me" an instant classic in the mid 1980s. 'Last Ditch Cabaret', 'Home Again' and 'You Don't Have to Cry Anymore' are some of the best tracks here and serve to highlight that Mark Seymour is one of Australia's finest singer/songwriters."

Track listing

Charts

Release history

References

1997 debut albums
Mark Seymour albums
Mushroom Records albums